Marthe-Marguerite Le Valois de Villette de Mursay, marquise de Caylus (1673–1729), was a French noblewoman and writer.

Born in Poitou, she was the daughter of vice-admiral Philippe, Marquis de Villette-Mursay, and Marie-Anne de Châteauneuf, who died in 1691. Her father was a cousin of Madame de Maintenon, who brought up Marthe-Marguerite like her own daughter.

In 1686 she married Anne de Tubières, comte de Caylus (1666–1704), and had two sons. Her elder son, Anne-Claude-Philippe (1692–1765), was also a man of letters and an archaeologist.

Madame de Caylus left piquant and valuable memoirs of the court of Louis XIV and the house of St. Cyr. These were edited by Voltaire (1770), and by many later editors. They were translated into English by Elizabeth Griffith as Memoirs, anecdotes, and characters of the court of Lewis XIV. Translated from Les Souvenirs, or recollections of Madame de Caylus (1770).

Literature 
 Souvenirs de Madame de Caylus, in the Complete Works of Voltaire, vol. 71A, Voltaire Foundation (2005), 
Souvenirs de Madame de Caylus, Mercure de France (1986),

References

External links
 
 

1673 births
1729 deaths
18th-century French memoirists
French women writers
Marquesses of Caylus
People of the Regency of Philippe d'Orléans
French women memoirists
17th-century French women writers
18th-century French women writers